Vath Koreshi (1936–2006) was one of the most renowned Albanian novelists and screen writers. He is perhaps best known for writing a series of romans and novels such as “The two Saturdays of Susana" (1971), “The Hajji of Frakulla" and “The marriage of Sako" (1980),“Requiem for a woman" (1995), "The wulf and the star" (1996), “A woman in yellow in Buddha Forest" (2003) etc., but also for writing scripts to the movies "Gjeneral Gramafoni" (1978); "Rrugë të Bardha" (1974). "Balada e Kurbinit" (1990) etc.

Biography of Vath Koreshi:

Education:   		 
1960-1964   Albanian Language and Literature, University of Tirana 
				
Work:                          
2001-2005	Member of the Albanian Parliament
1995-2000	Director, Publishing House “ONUFRI”;
1992-1995	Chief editor of Cultural Magazine “Art”;
1991-1992	Minister of Culture, Youth and Sports;
1987-1991	Director of Arts Department, Ministry of Culture;
1983-1987	Freelance writer;
1978-1983	Head of “Albafilm Studio”;
1973-1978	Journalist at the weekly art newspaper “Drita” (Light);
1964-1973	Journalist at “Zëri i Rinisë” (The Voice of Youth) newspaper;

Publications:    
1964	“Kur zunë shirat e vjeshtës” (When the fall rains began), Collection of short stories;
1968	“Toka nën hijen e shtëpive” (The land under the shadows of houses), Collection of short stories;
1971	“Dy të shtunat e Suzanës (The two Saturdays of Susana), Roman;
1971	“Ndërrimi i qiejve” (The change of skies), Collection of short stories;
1975	“Mars” (March), Roman;
1977	“Mali mbi kënetë” (The mountain over the marsh), Roman;
1980	“Haxhiu i Frakullës” (The Hajji of Frakulla), Roman; 
1980	“Dasma e Sakos” (The marriage of Sako), Roman; 
1985	“Rrugë për larg” (Road to far away), Roman;
1985	“Leopardi” (Lepard), Novel; 
1987	“Balada e Kurbinit” (The Ballad of Kurbin), Roman; 
1995	“Requiem për një grua” (Requiem for a woman), Roman; 
1996 	Ulku dhe Uilli (The wulf and the star), Roman; 
1999	“Konomea” (Konomea), Novel;
2003	“Një grua me te verdha ne pyllin e Buddha-s” (A woman in yellow in Buddha Forest), Roman;
2005	“Çafka” (The heron), Roman;

Scripts for artistic movies and documentaries:
1974		“Rrugë të bardha” (White roads);
1976		“Nga mesi i errësirës” (Into the dark);
1978		“Gjeneral Gramafoni” (General of Gramophone); 
1978		“Agimet e stinës së madhe” (The dawn of a great season); 
1979		“Liri a vdekje” (Freedom or death);
1980 		“Nata e parë e lirisë” (The first night of freedom); 
1982 		“Në kufi të dy legjendave” (Two legends); 
1982 		“Plaku dhe hasmi” (The old man and the enemy);
1984 		“Besa e kuqe” (The red pledge);
1986 		“Në prag të jetës” (On the threshold of life);
1987 		“Botë e padukshme” (Invisible world);
1990 		“Balada e Kurbinit” (The Ballad of Kurbin);
1998 		“Dasma e Sakos” (The marriage of Sako);
2000 		“Porta Eva” (Gate Eva);
2000 		“Lotët e Kosovës” (The Tears of Kosova);
2000 		“Në kërkim të Hafize Leskovikut” (About Hafize Leskoviku);
2000 		“Të bekuarit” (Blessed);
2002 		“Bir” (Son);  
2002 		“O Çoban” (Remzi Lela –sobriquet Çobani (the Shepherd);    
     
DRAMA:
1967		“Hijet ikin nga mallet” (Shadows move away from mountains); 
1968		“Njerëzit e minierës” (Mine people);
1970		“Mysafiri i natës” (The night guest);

AWARDS:
2020		“Honorary Citizen (posthumous) of the city of Gjirokastra;
2008		Republic of Albania “Honour of the Nation” (posthumous);
2000		“Honorary Citizen of the city of Lushnja (birthplace); 

Republic award for:
1979		Gjeneral Gramafoni (The General of Gramophone) –movie script; 
1981		Dasma e Sakos (The marriage of Sako) – Roman; 
   
Order “Naim Frashëri”:
1985    	Order of the First Rank; 
1976		Order of the Second Rank;
1969		Order of the Third Rank;

International awards:
1990	“Gjeneral Gramafoni” (General of Gramophone), diploma, International Festival of Istanbul;
1990	“Balada e Kurbinit” (The Ballad of Kurbin-movie), Diploma International Festival of Paris for artistic and historic movies; this was also the first Albanian movie to represent Albania in the Venice Festival in 1989.
1996		Literature Award “Çikal Brindizi”;
	                  
CUPS OF ALBANIAN NATIONAL FESTIVALS: 

1979    “Gjeneral Gramafoni” (General of Gramophone);
1987    “Balada e Kurbinit” (The Ballad of Kurbin);
2000  	"Dasma e Sakos" (The Marriage of Sako) (the Best Movie script).

External links
 
 Vath Koreshi Photos
 Author Vath Koreshi
 Yorba Linda: California
 Screenwriter Vath koreshi

References

1936 births
2006 deaths
Albanian screenwriters
Government ministers of Albania
Culture ministers of Albania
20th-century screenwriters